Frank Boyes (January 29, 1874 in South Dorchester, Ontario, Canada – May 28, 1961) was a Canadian politician and cheese maker. He was elected to the House of Commons of Canada as a Member of the Conservative Party in 1930 to represent the riding of Middlesex East. He was defeated in the 1935 election. He also served for three years as reeve of North Dorchester, Ontario.

References

1874 births
1961 deaths
Conservative Party of Canada (1867–1942) MPs
Members of the House of Commons of Canada from Ontario